World Sight Day, observed annually on the second Thursday of October, is a global event meant to draw attention on blindness and vision impairment. It was originally initiated by the SightFirstCampaign of Lions Club International Foundation in 2000.

It has since been integrated into VISION 2020 and is coordinated by IAPB in cooperation with the World Health Organization.

The theme for World Sight Day 2014—held on October 9, 2014—was "No more Avoidable Blindness".

It took place on the second Thursday in October 2014.

World Sight Day, 2000–present
The following table shows the themes (or ‘call to actions') of each World Sight Day since 2000.

References

October observances
Thursday observances 
Holidays and observances by scheduling (nth weekday of the month)